Aduthaduthu is a 1984 Indian Malayalam film, directed by Sathyan Anthikkad. The film stars Rahman, Sukumari, Thilakan, KPAC Lalitha and Ahalya in the lead roles. The film has musical score by Raveendran.

Cast

Rahman as Raju
Mohanlal as Vishnu Mohan
Sukumari as Gaurikutty
Thilakan as Thankappan
KPAC Lalitha as Kausalya
Ahalya as Radha
Karamana Janardanan Nair as Ayyappan
Ashokan as Jeevan Philip
Beena as Raman Kutty's wife
Sankaradi as Adiyodi
Bharath Gopi as Father Clement Kuriapalli
Lissy as Rema S. Menon
Bahadoor as Hajiyaar
Kuthiravattam Pappu as Raman Kutty
Mala Aravindan as Kariachan

Soundtrack
The music was composed by Raveendran and the lyrics were written by Sathyan Anthikkad and G. Sankara Kurup.

References

External links
 

1984 films
1980s Malayalam-language films